Ben Kusto (born 23 February 1976) is an Australian former professional rugby league footballer who played in the 1990s and 2000s.

Playing career
Kusto started his career off with St. George where he played for 3 seasons before moving to Parramatta.  Kusto played in St. George's final game before they formed a joint venture with the Illawarra Steelers to become St. George Illawarra.  A semi-final loss to Canterbury-Bankstown at Kogarah Oval.  

Kusto spent two seasons at Parramatta and was part of the 2000 Parramatta side which the media dubbed "The Baby Eels".  Kusto left Parramatta at the end of the 2000 NRL season to join English side Huddersfield.  

Kusto was part of the Huddersfield side which were relegated from the Super League.  Kusto then signed a contract to rejoin Parramatta.  At the end of the 2002 NRL season, Kusto was released by the club.

References

1976 births
Living people
Rugby league halfbacks
Australian rugby league players
St. George Dragons players
Parramatta Eels players
Huddersfield Giants players
Place of birth missing (living people)